Lydia Mugambe, is the Inspector General of Government (IGG) as of March 2022, a Ugandan lawyer who served as judge at the High Court of Uganda between May 2013 and September 2020. She was appointed to the High Court by President Yoweri Museveni, on 3 May 2013. Lady Justice Mugambe Ssali was subsequently appointed by President Museveni as Inspector General of Government on 18th September 2020

Background and education
She graduated from the Faculty of Law of Makerere University, Uganda's largest and oldest public university, with a Bachelor of Laws. She was then awarded a Diploma in Legal Practice by the Law Development Centre, in Kampala, Uganda's capital city. She also holds a Master of Laws from the University of Pretoria in  South Africa.

Career
Prior to her appointment to the High Court, Mugambe served as a Magistrate in Uganda's lower courts. She was appointed to the High Court of Uganda on 15 May 2013. She is assigned to the Civil Division of the court.

In January 2017, Justice Mugambe delivered a judgement against Mulago National Referral Hospital, which had been sued by Jennifer Musimenta and her husband Micheal Mubangaizi, for the disappearance of their newborn baby. The judge found the hospital culpable of negligence. Mugambe also awarded the couple USh85 million (approximately US$24,000) in damages.

The ruling is hailed by legal observers and non-profit organisations in Uganda, as a watershed judgment, towards the recognition of "the rights of poor, vulnerable and marginalized women". The ruling was nominated for the Center for Health, Human Rights and Development (CEHURD), award in 2017.

See also
Jane Kiggundu
Monica Mugenyi
Ministry of Justice and Constitutional Affairs (Uganda)

References

External links
 Website of Lydia Mugambe
 Website of the Judiciary of Uganda
 Justice Mugambe Orders Tumukunde, Kaka to Produce Etukuri

21st-century Ugandan lawyers
Year of birth missing (living people)
Living people
Ugandan women lawyers
Ugandan women judges
Makerere University alumni
Law Development Centre alumni
University of Pretoria alumni
People from Central Region, Uganda
Justices of the High Court of Uganda
20th-century Ugandan women
21st-century Ugandan women